The Roman Catholic Diocese of Fenoarivo Atsinanana is a diocese located in the city of Fenoarivo Atsinanana in the Ecclesiastical province of Toamasina in Madagascar.

Its cathedral episcopal see is the Cathédrale Saint Maurice, in the city of Fenoarivo Atsinanana, Toamasina Province.

History
 October 30, 2000: Established as Diocese of Fenoarivo Atsinanana from the Metropolitan Archdiocese of Antsiranana

Leadership
 Bishops of Fenoarivo Atsinanana(Roman rite)
 Bishop Désiré Tsarahazana (October 30, 2000 - February 10, 2009), appointed Bishop of Toamasina; future Cardinal
 Bishop Marcellin Randriamamonjy (February 10, 2009 – present)

See also
Roman Catholicism in Madagascar

References
 GCatholic.org
 Catholic Hierarchy

Roman Catholic dioceses in Madagascar
Christian organizations established in 2000
Roman Catholic dioceses and prelatures established in the 20th century
Roman Catholic Ecclesiastical Province of Toamasina
2000 establishments in Madagascar